EC135, EC-135, or EC 135 may be:
 Boeing EC-135, a cargo airplane used for several U.S. Air Force missions.
 Eurocopter EC135, twin-engine civil helicopter